The variable skink  (Trachylepis varia) is a species of skink found in Africa.

References

Trachylepis
Reptiles described in 1867
Taxa named by Wilhelm Peters